Edward Aylward (1894 – February 1976) was an Irish Sinn Féin politician. He was elected unopposed as a Sinn Féin Teachta Dála (TD) to the 2nd Dáil at the 1921 elections for the Carlow–Kilkenny constituency. He opposed the Anglo-Irish Treaty and voted against it. He stood as an anti-Treaty Sinn Féin candidate at the 1922 general election but was not elected.

References

1894 births
1976 deaths
Early Sinn Féin TDs
Members of the 2nd Dáil
20th-century Irish farmers